Darkha Sulman Khel is a town and union council of Lakki Marwat District in the Khyber-Pakhtunkhwa province of Pakistan.

References

Union councils of Lakki Marwat District
Populated places in Lakki Marwat District